Napis Tortungpanich (born 29 March 1995) is a Thai sport shooter. He competed in the men's 10 metre air rifle event at the 2016 Summer Olympics.

References

External links
 

1995 births
Living people
Napis Tortungpanich
Napis Tortungpanich
Shooters at the 2016 Summer Olympics
Place of birth missing (living people)
Napis Tortungpanich
Napis Tortungpanich
Southeast Asian Games medalists in shooting
Shooters at the 2014 Asian Games
Shooters at the 2018 Asian Games
Competitors at the 2011 Southeast Asian Games
Napis Tortungpanich
Competitors at the 2013 Southeast Asian Games
Competitors at the 2015 Southeast Asian Games
Competitors at the 2017 Southeast Asian Games
Competitors at the 2019 Southeast Asian Games
Napis Tortungpanich
Napis Tortungpanich